Albertus Swanepoel (born 1959) is a South African milliner based in New York, whose hat designs have featured in the runway shows of designers such as Carolina Herrera, Alexander Wang, Narciso Rodriguez and Tommy Hilfiger. A BA Fine Arts graduate from the University of Pretoria, Swanepoel won the Coty Award as South Africa’s top designer before moving to the United States in 1989.

Biography 

Swanepoel launched a range of made-to-measure clothing under his Quartus Manna label in 1983 before starting a glove business in New York in 1992. While continuing with the glove business, he started evening millinery classes and pursued various freelance millinery jobs while making his own hats on the side. Among his freelance collaborations he worked with theatrical milliner Lynne Mackey, constructing hats for several Broadway shows, including Kiss Me, Kate and Mamma Mia!.

In 2004 Swanepoel collaborated with Marc by Marc Jacobs for a Fall hat collection, and the following year worked with Proenza Schouler on hats for a Spring collection. In 2006 he started his own company, Albertus Swanepoel LLC, which sells namesake collections to selected USA retail stores and to several international markets. His designs have featured in publications such as Vogue, Harper’s Bazaar, Time, Glamour, The Wall Street Journal and The New York Times.

Awards 

2008: 	Runner up in the Vogue/CFDA Fashion Fund Awards
2009: 	Nominated as Accessory Designer in CFDA/Swarovski Awards
2010: 	Accessory Designer Award: African Fashion week International
	Nominated as Accessory Designer in WGSN Awards
2014: 	University of Pretoria Alumni Laureate Award 
	South African Style Award

References 

http://albertusswanepoel.com/#/life
http://www.safashionweek.co.za

University of Pretoria alumni
1959 births
Living people
Milliners
South African fashion designers